Henrique & Juliano, sometimes written Henrique e Juliano, is a Brazilian sertanejo duo. Their single, "Cuida bem dela", was number 1 for 8 weeks in Brasil Hot 100 Airplay and has been accessed by over 220 million viewers on YouTube.

The brothers are from Palmeirópolis, in the Brazilian state of Tocantins. They have been compared to other male sertaneja duos, Henrique & Diego and Jorge e Mateus.

Discography

Albums

2011: Vem Curtir com a Gente – Independente – CD
2012: Henrique & Juliano - CD
2013: Ao Vivo em Palmas - Som Livre – CD/DVD
2014: Ao Vivo em Brasília – Som Livre – CD/DVD
2016: Novas Histórias - Som Livre – CD/DVD
2017: O Céu Explica Tudo - Som Livre – CD/DVD
2018: Menos é Mais - Som Livre – CD/DVD
2020: Ao Vivo no Ibirapuera - Som Livre – CD/DVD

Singles 

Collaborations

References

External links
 Official site. 
 Lyrics and chords. 

Brazilian musical duos
Sertanejo music groups
Musical groups established in 2008